Leopoldo O'Donnell y Jorris, 1st Duke of Tetuán, GE (12 January 1809 – 5 November 1867), was a Spanish general and Grandee who was Prime Minister of Spain on several occasions.

Early life
He was born at Santa Cruz de Tenerife in the Canary Islands, a son of Carlos O'Donnell (born 1768) and Josefa Jorris y Casaviella. He was a paternal grandson of José O'Donnell and Marie Anne d'Anethan. He was of distant Irish paternal ancestry, the 11th generation descendant of Calvagh O'Donnell, Rí of Tír Chonaill, a Gaelic territory in the west of Ulster in the north of Ireland. He had an uncle, Francisco, and an aunt, Beatriz, who married Manuel Pombo y Ante (1769–1829), and had issue.

Career

O'Donnell was a strong supporter of the liberal Cristinos and the regency of Maria Christina of Bourbon-Two Sicilies during the 1830s. When General Baldomero Espartero seized power in 1840, O'Donnell went into exile with Maria Christina, and was involved in an attempted coup against Espartero in 1841. O'Donnell was soon back in power and was sent to Cuba as Captain General in October 1843.

O'Donnell was responsible for the 1844 massacre known as the repression of "La Escalera". Thousands of slaves and free-coloured people in Cuba were confined in dungeons, were tortured and executed in what became known as the 'year of the lash'. In 1854, he made a pronunciamiento against the government and was named Prime Minister for a time. He served as War Minister of the Espartero government.

The Crimean War caused an increase of grain prices due to the blockade of Russia, causing a famine in Galicia during 1854. Riots against power looms spread through Spain, and General O'Donnell intervened, marching on Madrid. Espartero resigned power in O'Donnell's favour on 14–15 July 1856, and Queen Isabella II asked him to form a government as the 44th Prime Minister of Spain. 

For his new administration, O'Donnell formed the Unión Liberal Party, which was designed to combine Progressive, Moderate, and Carlist factions. O'Donnell attempted to define moderate policies for Spain with this new party, advocating laissez-faire policies and confiscating church land. He was soon dismissed after only a few months in power on 12 October, and two years of reaction  followed.

In later governments, O'Donnell was more careful. His two later administrations worked laboriously to attract foreign investment to improve Spain's railroad infrastructure. He failed to achieve much economic growth, however, and increased industry only in Basque country and Catalonia, both of which already had substantial industrial centres. He was a proponent of a new and aggressive imperial policy, intended principally to expand Spanish territory in Africa, particularly after French successes in Algeria.

In the first administration he was twice at the same time the 136th Minister of Foreign Affairs and the 48th Prime Minister of Spain between 30 June 1858 and 2 July 1858, and again as the 138th Minister of Foreign Affairs between 21 October 1860 and 18 January 1863, remaining again solely as Prime Minister until 26 February 1863. His second term as the 53rd Prime Minister started on 21 October 1860.

He took a brief respite from his government in 1860 to command the Spanish army at the battle of Tetuan during its Spanish-Moroccan War, overseeing the capture of Tétouan. He was rewarded for his abilities in the campaign with the title Duke of Tetuán. 

In 1866, he repressed a revolt commanded by General Juan Prim, and was subsequently dismissed by the queen for the brutality of his regime on 11 July 1866. He was the 103rd Grand Cross of the Order of the Tower and Sword.

Family

He was succeeded in his titles by his nephew, son of his brother Carlos O'Donnell y Jorris and wife María del Mar Álvarez de Abreu y Rodríguez de Albuerne, Carlos O'Donnell y Álvarez de Abreu (1834 – 1903), 2nd Duke of Tetuán, 2nd Count of Lucena and also 9th Marquess of Altamira, married in Madrid on 1 June 1861 to María Josefa de Vargas y Díez de Bulnes (Madrid, 25 July 1838 – 5 November 1905).

Notes

References

External links

|-

|-

|-

|-

|-

|-

1809 births
1867 deaths
Counts of Lucena
Dukes of Tetuan
Governors of Cuba
Grandees of Spain
Leaders of political parties in Spain
Liberal Union (Spain) politicians
Military personnel of the First Carlist War
Leopoldo
People from Santa Cruz de Tenerife
People of the Chincha Islands War
Prime Ministers of Spain
Spanish captain generals
Spanish people of Irish descent
Viscounts of Spain
Spanish military personnel of the Hispano-Moroccan War (1859–60)
Spanish nobility